Blossoms Senior Secondary School is a higher-secondary co-education private school in the Patiala city of Punjab. The school was founded in 1981 and is affiliated to the Central Board of Secondary Education of India.

References

External links 

Co-educational schools in India
High schools and secondary schools in Patiala
Educational institutions established in 1981
1981 establishments in Punjab, India